{{Infobox writer
| embed            = 
| honorific_prefix = 
| name             = Mary R. T. McAboy
| honorific_suffix = 
| image            = Mary Rootes Thornton McAboy 1884 (cropped).png
| caption          = 
| native_name      = 
| native_name_lang = 
| pseudonym        = "M. R. M., Roseheath, Ky."
| birth_name       = 
| birth_date       = February 9, 1815
| birth_place      = Bourbon County, Kentucky, U.S.
| death_date       = April 5, 1892 (aged 77)
| death_place      = Paris, Kentucky, U.S.
| resting_place    = 
| occupation       = poet
| education        = 
| alma_mater       = 
| period           = 
| genre            = 
| subject          = 
| movement         = 
| notable_works    = 'Roseheath poems| spouse           = 
| partner          = 
| children         = 
| relatives        = 
| awards           = 
| signature        = Mary Rootes Thornton McAboy ("M.R.M.") signature (cropped).png
}}
Mary R. T. McAboy (Thornton; pen name, M. R. M., Roseheath, Ky.; February 9, 1815 – April 5, 1892) was a 19th-century poet of the American south. From 1850, she was a contributor to the press of Kentucky and elsewhere over the signature of "M. R. M., Roseheath, Ky."; her writings were universally popular.

Biography
Mary Rootes Thornton was born in Bourbon County, Kentucky, February 9, 1815. Her father was Peter Thornton of Caroline County, Virginia. Her mother's maiden name was Rowe. There were five siblings in this family: Sally Tunstall (Thornton), Mary Rootes (Thornton), Thomas; Callender, and Read.

She was raised and educated by her uncle, Hon. John Rootes Thornton (1786-1873). He was a prominent lawyer and a member of the Kentucky House of Representatives (1844), and State Senate (1829–33; 1833–37).

On April 24, 1839, she married Rev. Paradise Lynn McAboy (1814–1839), of Washington, Mason County, Kentucky, a young Presbyterian minister. She was widowed four months later when the husband was killed by the falling of a large flour mill at Murphysville, Mason County, Kentucky, on August 29, 1839.

McAboy's signature, “M. R. M., Roseheath, Ky.," was well known at intervals for thirty years to readers of the Louisville Journal, Paris Citizen, Paris True Kentuckian, Memphis Enquirer, Presbyterian Herald of Cincinnati, and other newspapers and monthlies. She resided in the Thornton homestead in Paris, Kentucky where she entertained many distinguished men in the ministry of the church and state. It was George D. Prentice, who, while visiting her, named her homestead, "Roseheath". McAboy died at "Roseheath", Paris, April 5, 1892.

Selected works

 Roseheath poems'', 1884

Notes

References

Attribution

Bibliography

External links
 

1815 births
1892 deaths
People from Bourbon County, Kentucky
Poets from Kentucky
American women poets
19th-century American poets
19th-century American women writers
19th-century pseudonymous writers
Pseudonymous women writers